Cherukuri is an Indian surname. Notable people with the surname include:

Cherukuri Lenin (1985/1986–2010), Indian archer and coach
Azad (Maoist), birth name Cherukuri Rajkumar (1952–2010), Indian Communist Party militant
 Cherukuri Ramoji Rao (born 1936), known as Ramoji Rao, Indian film producer and media entrepreneur

Indian surnames
Telugu-language surnames